The Red Deer Transit Department is part of the Community Services Division of the City of Red Deer, which lies midway between Calgary and Edmonton in the province of Alberta, Canada. The city took over operation of the public transit system from private operators in 1966. In 2009 transit service was extended to Springbrook and Gasoline Alley in Red Deer County. In 2014 transit service was extended to Blackfalds and Lacombe to the north. In 2019 transit service was extended to Penhold and Innisfail. In mid 2019 the City of Red Deer announced plans to engage in improvements to the transit network.

History
There are 12 regular bus routes that operate daily. Hours of operation are on Monday to Saturday from 6:15 am to 11:15 pm and on Sundays and Holidays from 8:45 am to 6:45 pm. Exact cash fare, prepaid ticket or pass is required to ride the transit service. Route 50 provides peak hour service to the Edgar Industrial Park. The Riverside Industrial Park is served by Route 51, the main peak hour service provider for this area; various limited service deviations are known as Route 52, 53 and 54.

BOLT Transit 
In 2014, transit service was extended to Lacombe and Blackfalds via BOLT transit, its terminus was Sorrensen Station in Red Deer. Service was suspended on August 28, 2020 and was superseded by BOLT (Blackfalds On-demand Local Transit) in the Town of Blackfalds the following Monday (August 31, 2020).

South 2A Transit 
Additionally, Route 12A provided peak hour service and limited weekend service to Springbrook. In 2019 service was expanded to Innisfail and Penhold and is now provided by South 2A Transit Routes 102/103 instead. The expanded service to Innisfail launched on January 14, 2019 after suspension of Greyhound Canada routes in Western Canada in summer 2018, and was started as a pilot project to replace missing transit links in the province by the Government of Alberta.

Moving Red Deer Forward
Moving Red Deer Forward: Our Multimodal Transportation Plan was approved by council on July 10, 2017. This plan provided framework for BRT, LRT and HSR corridors through the city.

City In Motion: Transit Network Improvements Project 

The Transit Network Improvements Project will put some of this framework and these policies into practice.

Occurring at the same time as the Transit Network Improvements Project is the cancellation of BOLT Transit on August 30, 2020 and will be replaced by a shuttle service linking Blackfalds and taking advantage of the new Kingston Dr. Hub in Red Deer. The shuttle will be operated by Prairie Bus Lines on behalf of the Town of Blackfalds.

On October 4, 2020 full service levels launched after delays due to the COVID-19 pandemic.

Routes Prior to August 23, 2020

Services

Regular Service

School Service 
Red Deer Transit provides Peak Overload services to the Red Deer Public School District as well as Red Deer Catholic Regional Schools for certain middle schools and all high schools in Red Deer.

Olymel/Riverside Service

Transit Hubs

Sorensen Station 
The city owned transit terminal and parkade is located on the southwest corner of 49 Street and 49 Avenue. The facility includes a customer service centre and a three-storey parkade with over 400 parking spaces.

Part of the Transit Network Improvements Project was to establish new locations for transfers outside the Greater Downtown, these hubs are:

Bower Hub 
Located on Bennett St. at the Bower Place Shopping Centre, it is the networks southernmost terminus.

Kingston Dr. Hub 
Located on street at the intersection of Gaetz Ave. and Kingston Dr. in the northern neighbourhood of Kentwood.

References

External links
 Transit History of Red Deer, Alberta

Transit agencies in Alberta
Transport in Red Deer, Alberta